Rugby union in South Korea is a minor but growing sport.  Of the two Korean nations, the game tends to be mostly played in South Korea; North Korea's mostly small rugby union presence is limited to Koreans in Japan.

Governing body
The Korean Union was set up in 1946, and affiliated to the IRFB in 1988.

History
It is unknown when rugby was first played in Korea. During the mid-19th century, European sailors are recorded as playing some of the earliest games in north east Asia, in ports such as Shanghai and Yokohama in neighbouring China and Japan, but it is unclear whether this occurred in Korea itself.

However, it seems certain it had some presence by the mid-20th century. Korea was to become occupied by Japan, the main rugby playing nation of Asia, and it could well have been introduced then. South Korea still maintains a fierce rivalry with Japan to this day.

After World War II, and later, during the period of the Korean War, the large influx of troops from Commonwealth countries cemented its presence. One legacy of this is that South Korean rugby has traditionally been strongest in the army.

However, South Korean rugby has a second string to its bow. The massive growth of the economy since the 1960s, meant that a number of Korean corporations were to set up company teams along the lines of those in Japan, and this has broken up the former dominance of the military.

South Korea made a failed attempt to have rugby union at the Olympic Games readmitted, when they hosted the games in Seoul. Roh Tae-woo, who was South Korean president at the time, had been a player.

South Korea have emerged as an important rugby nation in Asia, since they won the Asian Championship in 1990.

Notable players include-
 Lee Ken Yok.
 Kim Yeon Ki.
 Sung Hae-Kyoung.
 Roh Tae-woo, disgraced 13th president of South Korea (1988–1993).

Expatriate rugby 
Expatriate rugby was first played in Korea in 1972. An expat team called the Seoul Wanderers were formed to give opposition to both the local university teams and stationed army teams. This team was made up of players from the UK, New Zealand, and Australia. The team was disbanded in 1976.

In early 1979 Franz Misch, Mike Seros and Brad Handley got together and formed a new club - the Seoul Survivors RFC. The club is still around today. 

Today a range of expat teams exist in South Korea which sees teams play rugby 10's in KERA-Korean Expat Rugby Association League. Unfortunately, a few clubs have disbanded due to the nature of expat-life - notably Daejeon and Daegu. Currently four clubs compete in the KERA League - Seoul Survivors RFC , Busan Rugby Club, Ulsan Goblins RFC and the Stars & Stripes RFC (US Armed Forces). Each club has the opportunity to host a tournament and showcase the game in their respective cities. This has led to growing support for the game of Rugby Union. Many players travel considerable distances to practice with, and play for one of the mentioned teams. This is due to the fact that the pool of players are generally too small to support teams in the smaller cities and country-side of the Republic of Korea.

The Busan Rugby Club is one of the clubs that have experienced rapid growth in player numbers and support. This is due to the fact that Busan is the second largest city in South Korea, is a popular summer destination (notably Haeundae beach and Gwangali beach) and has a large expat population. The club also draws considerable player numbers from the province located around Busan, Gyeonsangnam-do. Starting in 2016, the Busan Rugby Club showed a huge revival in their efforts to be recognized as a leading expatriate rugby club in Korea, by appointing a qualified coach, focus on training, and winning matches. Their hard work and concerted efforts paid off handsomely when they made history in 2017, by winning the KERA 2017 League trophy (The Joe Day Cup), The South Sea Cup and the KERA 2017 Knock Out Shield for the first time in the club's history. Busan Rugby then repeated their 2017 success by retaining the Joe Day Cup in 2018.

Updated information about the latest match results and current league standings are available at KERA.

See also
 KERA-Korean Expat Rugby League
 South Korea national rugby union team 
 South Korea national rugby sevens team
 Rugby union at the 2002 Asian Games
 Busan Rugby Club

External links
 IRB Korea Page
  Korea Rugby Union
 Rugby in Asia South Korea Homepage (in English)
 Asian Rugby Football Union
 Busan Rugby Club
 Busan Rugby Club Facebook
 Archives du Rugby: Coree du Sud
 Seoul Survivors RFC

References
 Richards, Huw A Game for Hooligans: The History of Rugby Union (Mainstream Publishing, Edinburgh, 2007)